The men's team pursuit speed skating competition of the Vancouver 2010 Olympics was held at Richmond Olympic Oval on 26 and 27 February 2010.

Records
Prior to this competition, the existing world and Olympic records were as follows.

The following new records were set during this competition.

OR = Olympic record, TR = track record

Results

Bracket

Quarterfinals

Semifinals

Finals

References

External links
 
 

Men's speed skating at the 2010 Winter Olympics